The Isle of Love is a 1922 recut of a 1920 American silent drama film Over the Rhine aka An Adventuress starring female impersonator Julian Eltinge. The film also contained two actors unknown during filming: Virginia Rappe and Rudolph Valentino. The film went through various recuts and re-releases during the 1920s and is generally known for its cast.

Plot
An island ("The Isle of Love"), run by a power-mad duke, is in turmoil. The peasants plan a revolt, with two buddies, including Cliff (Julian Eltinge), planning to overthrow the corrupt Duke.

Cliff invites his friend Jacques (Rudolph Valentino) to help, though Jacques spends most of his time with his love Vanette (Virginia Rappe).  Meanwhile, Cliff dresses up as a female as part of the plan and after much chaos all is well and he returns to America safe and sound.

Cast 
 Julian Eltinge as Clifford Townsend / Julie
 Virginia Rappe as Vanette 
 Rudolph Valentino as Jacques Rudanyi (billed as "R. De Valentina" and later as "Rodolph Valentino")
 Frederick Ko Vert as  Lyn Brook
 William Clifford as Dick Sayre 
 Leo White as Prince Halbere
 Stanton Beck as Grand Duke Nebo
 Charles Millfield as "Pom Pom"

Release and different versions
The original film was titled Over the Rhine and was an anti German propaganda piece starring Julian Eltinge, a transvestite actor, who was extremely popular at the time.  Filmed in 1918 Over the Rhine, it was shelved without release as World War I ended before it could go into distribution.

Two years later the film was recut and titled An Adventuress.  How it was recut is unknown, however, the film was not well received. In 1922, after Valentino rose to fame with The Four Horsemen of the Apocalypse, and Virginia Rappe had died in what became a scandal, the film was released once again under the title The Isle of Love.

The Isle of Love featured a poorly spliced-together story, which mostly intended to cash in on Valentino's newfound fame despite his original role being quite small, and also on the fallout from Rappe's death.  This led to shots of him being repeated several times nonsensically; and including his character for no apparent reason.  The Isle of Love cut is the only version of the film still in existence, and bears little resemblance to the original Over the Rhine storyline.  The final cut was a commercial failure much like An Adventuress.

The Isle of Love has yet to be released on DVD or home video, but a complete print of that version survives at the UCLA Film and Television Archive.

See also
(World War One Propaganda films)
The Kaiser, Beast of Berlin
Hearts of the World
To Hell with the Kaiser!
The Heart of Humanity
Yankee Doodle in Berlin
The False Faces
The Unpardonable Sin
The Unbeliever
Civilization
The Battle Cry of Peace

References

External links 

The Isle of Love at the Julian Eltinge Project

1922 films
1922 drama films
Silent American drama films
American LGBT-related films
American silent feature films
American black-and-white films
Cross-dressing in American films
Films directed by Fred J. Balshofer
1920s LGBT-related films
1910s American films
1920s American films